The Type A-2 leather flight jacket is an American military flight jacket originally invented and developed for and closely associated with World War II U.S. Army Air Forces pilots, navigators and bombardiers, who often decorated their jackets with squadron patches and elaborate artwork painted on the back. Sometimes casually referred to as a bomber jacket, its original designation was "Jacket, Pilot's (summer)", and its wartime usage was limited neither to pilots nor to bomber crews.

History
The Type A-2 flying jacket was adopted as standard issue by the U.S. Army Air Corps as the successor to the Type A-1 flying jacket on May 9, 1931, per specification number 94-3040.

The U.S. Army Air Forces Class 13 Catalog listed the garment as "Jacket, Flying, Type A-2". It describes the jacket's construction as "seal brown horsehide leather, knitted wristlets and waistband (skirt)." Broadly similar in construction to the A-1, it replaced the A-1's buttoned front and pocket flaps with a zipper and hidden snap fasteners (although the first three A-2 contracts retained the pocket buttons). The A-1's stand-up knitted collar, which buttoned closed, was supplanted in the A-2 by a shirt-style leather collar, with hidden snaps at the points and a hook-and-eye latch at the throat. Stitched-down shoulder straps were also added to the design. Sizes were listed as ranging in even numbers from 32 through 54.

The A-2 was replaced by the AN6552 (AN-J-3) per a specification 94-3040 reference document dated May 24, 1943, and declared "Limited Standard", meaning replacements were available. The April 1944 USAAF catalog for ordering supplies does not list the AN-J-3 as an option, but both the A-1 and A-2 are listed (the A-1 for $4.00 and the A-2 for $8.12). The lack of AN-J-3 replacements may explain why three U.S. A-2 contracts were granted in Dec. 1943, or after the A-2 jacket was officially replaced. (The lack of AN-J-3 replacements may also explain why flying jackets were purchased in Australia by the Department of the U.S. Army in June 1943. These "V505" jackets have been shown to be used by some members of the U.S. Fifth Air Force.)

Design and construction
Although the actual design would vary slightly depending on the manufacturer, and even among contracts within a single manufacturer, all A-2 jackets had several distinguishing characteristics: a snap-flap patch pocket on either side that does not have hand warmer compartments (hands in pockets were considered unfit for a military bearing), a shirt-style snap-down collar, shoulder straps (or Epaulets), knit cuffs and waistband, a back constructed from a single piece of leather to limit stress on the garment, and a cotton inner lining with a leather hang strap (not a loop) and military spec tag attached just below the back collar.

Prior to World War II the collar was sewn to a neckband or "stand" like those found in dress shirts, a time-intensive operation. Wartime contracts generally had "simple attached" collars, sewn directly to the back panel and rolled over, although Rough Wear and Perry continued using the collar stand throughout. Similarly, most pre-war (and some wartime) A-2s had inset sleeves, attached at a better attitude for body movement. This too was time-intensive and gave way to "flat attached" sleeves whose bottom seams met up with the body side seams.

A-2s were initially constructed of horsehide, which was either vegetable- or chrome-tanned. Some later A-2s were made from goatskin (as was the Navy G-1 jacket) and others from cowhide (which can be very difficult to tell from horse if tanned identically).  All Spiewak and Doniger jackets are of goat, as are many Cable, Dubow, Bronco, Perry, and Rough Wear examples.

Wartime-issued A-2 jackets appear in a wide range of color tones and hues, although all are based on two distinct colors: Seal (dark brown to almost black) and russet (pale red-brown to medium brown). Most lighter russet jackets were darker seal re-dyed during the war to cover scuffing and discoloration although some contracts, like the Aero Leather 21996, were dyed seal right from the start. Original knit cuffing typically matched the leather or came close, but exceptions exist, such as Aero Leather's eye-catching rust-red cuffing on seal brown hide.

The A-2 was one of the early articles of clothing designed expressly to use a zipper. Zippers were made of steel or brass, and some were nickel plated. Known zipper suppliers were Talon, Crown, Conmar, and Kwik, with Talon providing the majority of zippers used in wartime A-2 construction. Until about 1940, Talon zippers with riveted or grommeted metal bottoms were used.

Unlike modern, loose-fitting jackets, the original A-2 looks to us today a rather trim-fitting jacket. Period photos and films reveal a jacket which could be worn fitted and sharp looking or a bit baggy and loose in the body. It was designed to fit the thinner male of the time- original A-2 jackets worn by modern men may seem a bit snug in the shoulders. This is particularly true of pre-war contract garments such as the 1933 Werber and the 1938 and 1940 Aero Leathers. Period photos and films show that the A-2 was typically worn over a shirt, or a shirt and flight suit;  airmen were more likely to switch to a sheep-lined jacket or, later, an electrified flight suit for wintertime or high-altitude operations.

Manufacturers

There were many manufacturers of A-2 jackets during the 1930s and 1940s whose product showed a wide range of quality, workmanship, and fit characteristics. All contracts used a cotton lining, though various replacements were made over the years. The first three (3) contracts had button pocket flaps, while all the rest were snapped pockets beginning with Werber order number 33-1729. Manufacturers included civilian clothing producers such as David D. Doniger & Co., makers of the popular MacGregor brand outerwear, as well as leather-goods companies like J.A. Dubow Mfg., whose chief peacetime product was baseball mitts. Rough Wear manufactured the A-2 under several different contracts, each varying slightly in color and style.

Wartime use
The A-2 jacket was awarded to an Army Air Forces officer upon completion of basic flight training, and always before graduating to advanced training. No standard system of distribution was used, though generally airmen lined up in front of boxes containing jackets of various sizes and given the appropriate size jacket by the base quartermaster. A-2s were exclusive to commissioned officers until early in World War II, when also issued to enlisted aircrews.

The airman's A-2 was a treasured item and was worn with as much pride as his wings. As airmen progressed through various duty stations, they often added and removed squadron patches, rank marks, and occasionally elaborate artwork depicting the type of aircraft they flew or a copy of the artwork painted on their airplane. Bomber crews often added small bombs to the right front of their jackets, indicating the number of missions they had flown. As a result, many jackets ended up with numerous stitch marks as patches of various sizes were removed and replaced when the owner changed units. Unlike Navy aviators, who often wore the patches of every squadron they had ever flown with, AAF personnel could only display the patch of their current assignment. The emblem of the Army Air Forces was often sewn, painted, or applied by decal on the left shoulder, while the shield of the specific Air Force (5th, 8th, etc.) was often displayed on the right.

Despite the A-2s becoming a symbol of the American pilot, in 1943 General H. H. "Hap" Arnold canceled any further leather jacket contracts in favor of newer cloth-shell jackets like the B-10 and B-15. Needless to say, Arnold's popularity with his airmen was not improved by his decision. Even after the transition to cloth, existing units could still order replacement A-2s, keeping production going well into 1944. And it was impossible to prevent airmen from continuing to obtain and wear the style – as demonstrated by the large number of photos clearly showing Korean War pilots of F-82s and F-86s still wearing the original A-2 issued to them a decade earlier, or newer jackets made to fit their current sizes.

Fighter pilots, who often had heated cockpits, could wear the A-2 into combat more easily. Some jackets had a map of the mission area sewn into the lining, which could be used (in theory) for navigation if shot down.  Some jackets (famously, those from the China Burma India Theater, and of the Flying Tigers) had a "Blood chit" sewn on the lining or outer back, printed on cloth, which promised certain rewards to civilians who aided a downed airman. In certain ETO units and possibly elsewhere a prerogative of the fighter ace was a red satin lining which was added on confirmation of his fifth aerial kill.

Early wartime pictures show entire bomber crews outfitted with A-2s, although they probably weren't too valuable at altitude in a bomber. The pilot and copilot had primitive cabin heat on some aircraft and would wear the A-2, while the rest of the bomber crew usually wore heavier fleece-lined Type B-3 or ANJ-4 (and later B-9 and B-11 parkas), which were warmer and better suited to long hours in the severe cold. However, period photos show A-2s worn by crew underneath heavy outer garments, and candid on-base photos often show crewmen of all ranks in A-2s. A warm and comfortable mouton collar was an addition authorized in mountainous C-B-I commands.

Theater-made jackets
Throughout the War, as the A-2s popularity grew, so too did the demand for it. Only aircrewmen could obtain A-2 jackets through regular channels, although a few celebrated nonflying officers like Gens. MacArthur and Patton and Maj. Glenn Miller also procured and wore them. A small "cottage industry" soon appeared, especially in England, to make A-2-style jackets for GIs (including many airborne infantry troops) who otherwise could not get one. This was especially true after the Army stopped purchasing new leather jackets in mid-1943, and disappointed airmen were sent to war in the less desirable cloth jackets, or were unable to replace A-2s they had lost or damaged.  As a result, some war-era jackets used by World War II airmen are clearly not true to original AAF specifications, though this makes them no less historic.

Survivors
Original wartime issued A-2 jackets are rare but not unavailable. The value of such originals ranges widely depending on condition, known history, patches and artwork, and even size. Most originals used a sizing system considerably smaller than today's comparable sizes, with only 2- of "slack" over the tagged chest size. In other words, an original size 42 might be closer to a modern 40 or even a 38, depending on the manufacturer. Original World War II era jackets sell at auction for between $800 and $8,000, with wearable examples generally running $1,000 and up.

The National Museum of the United States Air Force has a collection of original A-2 jackets, most donated by the families of Air Force pilots. No fewer than fifty are on display at any time throughout the Museum, including many historic jackets such as Brig. Gen. James Stewart's A-2 (a Rough Wear contract 42-1401), an A-2 from the AVG "Flying Tigers," and another worn by one of the few U.S. pilots to get airborne during the attack on Pearl Harbor.

Modern Air Force A-2

With the exception of a very brief period from 1979 to early 1981 the U.S. Navy never stopped issuing its G-1 leather flying jackets to Navy, Marine, and Coast Guard flight crews. This meant that an entire generation of Air Force pilots and flight crews had missed out on an opportunity not lost to their Naval comrades. Years of effort by U.S. Air Force personnel to get the A-2 jacket reissued finally succeeded when the Air Force began issuing them again in 1988, a decision that may have been influenced by the popularity of the film "Top Gun", and the military apparel it popularized. The first Air Force A-2 contract was awarded to Avirex, but all subsequent contracts from 1988 to 1998 were awarded to Neil Cooper USA, now U.S. Wings of Ohio. The modern Air Force A-2 is authorized for wear by Air Force aircrews and missileers who have completed their mission qualifications.

The latest design differs from the original design in several ways: it is looser-fitting, made only from goatskin, and produced in only a medium seal brown color (though many older, fitted jackets are still in use). Unlike the World War II era pilots, modern Air Force pilots are not permitted to paint their A-2 jackets or disfigure them in any way. The official explanation for this is that the paint is flammable and could pose a fire hazard. The goatskin used in today's A-2 is treated with a special fire retardant chemical. The crewmember's name tag is mounted on the left breast, with the Major Command, HQ USAF, or Combatant Command shield are on the right, attached with Velcro. No patches are permitted to be sewn directly onto the jacket as they were during World War II.

In 1996 Neil Cooper USA was awarded a contract from the Defense Supply Center, Philadelphia (DSCP), to redesign the A-2 jacket to be more functional and to improve the fit. Side entry pockets were added to the patch pockets and inside wallet pockets were added. The fit was enlarged via extra pieces under the arms and on the sides.  The neck clasp was also eliminated.  These modifications were previously carried out by the member themselves at popular places around the world like Pop's Leather in Turkey, or in the numerous shops in Korea.  Now that these modifications are part of the official issue, only "Blood Chits" and other internal linings are added by the aircrew themselves.

In 1999 Avirex was again awarded a contract to make A-2 jackets. In 2000 they began producing the "21st Century" A-2 using the updated pattern Neil Cooper USA had designed. In 2006, HQ USAF required all A-2 jackets to be "Berry Amendment" compliant. This means that all materials used in the jacket must be of American origin. Goat skins used are required to have been born and bred in the U.S., and the leather tanned in the U.S. (All jackets made by Cooper Sportswear, and the jackets made by Avirex in 1999, were made of goatskin imported from Pakistan).

Reproductions
Just as a cottage industry appeared during the war to meet the need for A-2 jackets, so too does such an industry still exist today. Because the A-2 never went out of style, production of it never really ceased. Over the years it has varied in style and accuracy relative to the original war-era design, but it has remained visible in popular movies and TV shows of the 1950s and 1960s.

In the mid-1970s several small companies catering to purists began undertaking the job of designing and constructing somewhat authentic reproductions. Duplicating wartime patterns, often obtained through "reverse engineering" from dissected originals, but using incorrect hides that are veg tanned and aniline dyed, originals were chrome tanned and pigment dyed, all-cotton thread, and even actual the World War II-era-old stock Talon zippers, they have effectively recreated a wartime-era jacket that can be worn daily without fear of damaging a valuable original. Some manufacturers have even gone so far as to reproduce the particular details of specific World War II A-2 production contracts. The rarest and most desirable A-2, the Goldsmith 31-1897, has even been recreated based upon photographic evidence as a survivor has not been found.

Popularly priced (approximately US $500 and below) A-2 jackets today only approximate the authentic style, with oversized shoulders and sleeves intended for layering loose clothing underneath, non-spec hand and pen pockets, and softer materials like lambskin. A-2s made today by U.S. Air Force contract manufacturers tend to fit younger, fitter men with v-shaped torsos, and some former pilots have found that their old A-2s no longer fit them.

In the media
A-2 jackets can be seen in many movies, as they came to represent the American fighting man just as much as the P-51 Mustang and M1911 pistol. Seeing legendary actors such as Gregory Peck and John Wayne on the big screen wearing A-2s only reinforced their popularity. By the 1950s the A-2 was moving into the role of the motorcycle jacket, which would soon evolve into its own distinct style. The jacket worn by Henry Winkler in the role of "Fonzie" in the TV show Happy Days was a variation of the A-2 jacket. In the 1960s and 1970s the A-2 reappeared in a new crop of big budget World War II films such as The Great Escape and Patton, as well as being the wardrobe of choice for Bob Crane's character of Colonel Hogan in the popular TV series Hogan's Heroes. This same jacket, manufactured by the studio's costume department, had previously been worn by Frank Sinatra in the film Von Ryan's Express.  The bomber jacket has made appearances in non-war films, as well.   A teenage C. Thomas Howell wears a black A-2 for nearly the entire length of the classic horror film The Hitcher.    
Dwight Schultz' character H. M. Murdock on 1980s TV show The A-Team wore an A-2 Jacket with a tiger printed on the back along with the words 'DA NANG 1970'. His character wore the jacket throughout the show's 5 seasons. Also, in the anime Hetalia: Axis Powers, the character America is most always seen wearing an A-2 jacket with the number '50' on the back in white. Arnold Schwarzenegger also appeared an wearing A-2 with police badge in his new 2013 movie The Last Stand.  

From the 1980s to the present, the A-2 became a popular presidential garment. Beginning with Ronald Reagan and continuing to Joe Biden, every President and in certain cases, some Vice-Presidents have been seen adorned with the jacket at military installations.

See also
Cooper A-2 jacket
B-32 jacket
G-1 military flight jacket
MA-1 bomber jacket

References

Jackets
United States military uniforms
United States Air Force uniforms
Military equipment introduced in the 1930s